Naicam is a small town in rural Saskatchewan. In 2006 the population was 690. The name of the town is a combination of Naismith and Cameron, the railway construction contractors.

Utilities
Naicam receives several radio stations from both Saskatoon and Regina.
The local cable television company for the Naicam area is Image Cable. SaskTel provides cellular service to the area.

The Town of Naicam offers water, sewer and power to all households and businesses.

Education
Naicam has a Kindergarten to grade 12 school that also serves other communities in the area such as Pleasantdale, Spalding, and Saint Front.

Sports
Viking Sportsplex is the hub of Naicam's recreational activity.  With an arena playing home to all ages of hockey ranging from junior novice to senior. Hence the arena's name, all of the hockey teams in the town are called the "Naicam Vikings".  The facility also houses a three sheet curling rink, and a virtual golf simulator.

Demographics 

Attractions 
The Pioneer School (c. 1923-8) is a Municipal Heritage Property on the Canadian Register of Historic Places.

Businesses
There are several local businesses in Naicam, including grocery stores, hardware / lumber, hair and esthetics, restaurants, bakery, hotel and motel, insurance agencies, pharmacy, automotive repair and dealership, and  construction and contractors.

References

Towns in Saskatchewan